Exercises is the second studio album by the Scottish hard rock band Nazareth, released in 1972. Although their music is most accurately described as "blues-tinged hard rock" (CD liner notes), this record is quite far from the band's more standard fare, featuring, quite surprisingly, a number of acoustic arrangements, several songs with orchestral strings, and traditional Scottish airs.  Indeed, the album's "1692 (Glen Coe Massacre)" is about a real incident in Scottish history, namely, the massacre of Glencoe.  The album is also significant for its Roy Thomas Baker production—only his third project, and well before his breakthrough works with Queen in the mid-seventies—and its oddly 'new wave' cover-art (designed by CCS Associates).  An early version of the Razamanaz song, "Woke Up This Morning", also makes an appearance on Side 1. There were no cover versions on the album: it wouldn't be until their 10th studio album, No Mean City, that there was another album totally written by the band members.

Track listing

30th anniversary bonus tracks

Personnel
Nazareth
Dan McCafferty - vocals
Darrell Sweet - drums, backing vocals
Pete Agnew - bass guitar, acoustic guitar, backing vocals
Manny Charlton - guitar, 12-string guitar, backing vocals
Additional musicians
David Hentschel - synthesizer (A4, B2, B5)
Jedd Lander - bagpipes (B5), harmonica (A2, B1)
Colin Frechter - string arrangements (A1, B4, B5)
Technical
Robert M. Corich - liner notes, remastering
Laura Vallis - design
Mike Brown - remastering
Roy Thomas Baker - producer
Dave Field - Logo Design

References

External links
Lyrics to songs from Exercises

Nazareth (band) albums
1972 albums
Albums produced by Roy Thomas Baker
Mooncrest Records albums
Warner Records albums
A&M Records albums
Philips Records albums
Vertigo Records albums
albums recorded at Trident Studios